Biggsville Township is one of eleven townships in Henderson County, Illinois, USA.  As of the 2010 census, its population was 552 and it contained 266 housing units.

Geography

Cities, towns, villages
 Biggsville

Cemeteries
The township contains these four cemeteries: Biggsville, Cumberland Presbyterian, Huss and Salter's Grove.

Major highways
  U.S. Route 34
  Illinois Route 94

Airports and landing strips
 Corzatt Airport
 Seymour Landing Strip

Demographics

School districts
 West Central Community Unit School District 235

Political districts
 Illinois's 17th congressional district
 State House District 94
 State Senate District 47

References
 United States Census Bureau 2008 TIGER/Line Shapefiles
 
 United States National Atlas

External links
 City-Data.com
 Illinois State Archives
 Township Officials of Illinois

Townships in Henderson County, Illinois
1906 establishments in Illinois
Populated places established in 1906
Townships in Illinois